This is a list of manufacturers and suppliers of pharmaceuticals with operations in the United Kingdom.

Note: the activities of the parent companies of many of the companies listed below are not restricted solely to the United Kingdom. For example, AstraZeneca and GlaxoSmithKline, although headquartered in the United Kingdom, have activities in numerous other countries, and Johnson & Johnson and Pfizer are both headquartered in the United States and have activities in many countries worldwide.

Brand name of company – formal registered title of company

A&H – Allen & Hanburys Ltd
Abbott – Abbott Laboratories Inc.
Accord – Accord Healthcare Ltd.
Actelion – Actelion Pharmaceuticals UK Ltd
Aesica pharmaceuticals - Aesica Queenborough Ltd
Air Products – Air Products plc
Alcon – Alcon Laboratories (UK) Ltd
ALK-Abelló – ALK-Abelló (UK) Ltd
Allergan – Allergan Ltd
Alpharma – King Pharmaceuticals
Almus Pharmaceuticals - Walgreens Boots Alliance
Altana – Altana Pharma Ltd
Amgen – Amgen Ltd
APS – TEVA UK Ltd
Assertio – Assertio Therapeutics, Inc
AstraZeneca – AstraZeneca UK Limited
Aventis Pharma – Sanofi-Aventis Ltd
Bausch & Lomb – Bausch & Lomb UK Ltd
Baxter – Baxter International
Baxter BioScience – Baxter International
Bayer – Bayer plc (Pharmaceutical Division)
Becton Dickinson – Becton Dickinson UK Ltd
Beiersdorf – Beiersdorf UK Ltd
Berk – TEVA UK Ltd
Biogen – Biogen Idec
Boehringer Ingelheim – Boehringer Ingelheim Ltd
Boots – Boots Group (Medical Services)
BPL – Bio Products Laboratory
Braun – B. Braun Melsungen (Medical) Ltd
Bristol-Myers Squibb – Bristol-Myers Squibb Pharmaceuticals Ltd
Celltech – UCB Pharma Ltd
Cephalon – Cephalon UK Ltd
Chemidex – Chemidex Pharma Ltd
Chugai – Chugai Pharmaceutical Co. UK Ltd
Colgate-Palmolive – Colgate-Palmolive Ltd
Coloplast – Coloplast Ltd
Convatec – Convatec Ltd
Cow & Gate – Nutricia Clinical Care Ltd
CP – Wockhardt UK Ltd
Crookes – Crookes Healthcare Ltd
Dentsply – Dentsply Ltd
Dista – Dista Products Ltd, division of Eli Lilly and Company
DuPont – DuPont Pharmaceuticals Company, division sold to Bristol-Myers Squibb Pharmaceuticals Ltd
Eisai – Eisai Ltd
Essential Nutrition Ltd - Essential Nutrition Ltd
Ethicon – Ethicon Inc.
Fabre – Laboratoires Pierre Fabre Ltd
Ferring – Ferring Pharmaceuticals (UK)
Florizel – Florizel Ltd
Fresenius SE – Fresenius SE Ltd
Galderma – Galderma Laboratories (UK) Ltd
Galpharm Healthcare - Galpharm International Ltd
Garnier – Laboratoires Garnierdivision of Nestlé
GE Healthcare – GE Healthcare
Gilead – Gilead Sciences
GlaxoSmithKline – GlaxoSmithKline
Grünenthal – Grünenthal Ltd
Grifols – Grifols UK Ltd
GSK – GlaxoSmithKline
GSK Consumer Healthcare – GlaxoSmithKline Consumer Healthcare
Heinz – H. J. Heinz Company Ltd
Hillcross – AAH Pharmaceuticals Ltd
Hoechst Marion Roussel – Sanofi-Aventis Ltd
Invicta – Pfizer Ltd
Ipsen – Ipsen Ltd
ITH Pharma Ltd
IVAX – Ivax Corporation UK Ltd
J&J – Johnson & Johnson Ltd
J&J Medical – Johnson & Johnson Medical
J&J MSD – (Johnson & Johnson MSD) McNeil Laboratories Ltd
Janssen-Cilag – Janssen-Cilag Ltd
King – King Pharmaceuticals Ltd
Kyowa Hakko – Kyowa Hakko UK Ltd
Lederie – Wyeth
LEO – LEO Pharma
LifeScan – LifeScan
Lilly – Eli Lilly and Company Ltd
Lundbeck – Lundbeck Ltd
Martindale Pharma – Martindale Pharmaceuticals - Ltd (Now Ethypharm UK)
Mölnlycke – Mölnlycke Health Care Ltd
Mayne – Mayne Pharma plc
McNeil – McNeil Laboratories Ltd
Meda – Meda Pharmaceuticals Ltd
Medac – Medac (UK), Scion House, University of Stirling
MediSense – MediSense, Abbott Laboratories Ltd
Menarini – A. Menarini Pharma UK SRL
Menarini Diagnostics – A. Menarini Diagnostics
Merck – Merck Pharmaceuticals
Merck Consumer Health – Seven Seas Ltd
Merck & Co. – Merck Sharp & Dohme Ltd
Milupa – Milupa Ltd
MSD – Merck & Co. Ltd
Nestlé – Nestlé UK Ltd
Nestlé Clinical – Nestlé Clinical Nutrition
Neutrogena – Johnson & Johnson Ltd
Novartis – Novartis Pharmaceuticals UK Ltd
Novartis Consumer Health – Novartis Consumer Healththcare 
Novo Nordisk – Novo Nordisk Ltd
Nycomed – Nycomed UK Ltd
Octapharma – Octapharma Ltd
Oral B Labs – Oral B Laboratories Ltd
Orion – Orion Corporation (UK) Ltd
Otsuka – Otsuka Pharmaceutical Co. (UK) Ltd
Parke-Davis – Pfizer Ltd
Pfizer – Pfizer Ltd
Pharmacia – Pfizer Ltd
Pharmaron Biologics - was Allergan Biologics
Procter & Gamble – Procter & Gamble Ltd
Procter & Gamble Pharm. – Procter & Gamble Technical Centres, Medical Dept
Reckitt Benckiser – Reckitt Benckiser Healthcare
Rhône-Poulenc - Sanofi-Aventis Ltd
Roche – Roche Products Ltd
Roche Consumer Health – Bayer plc
Roche Diagnostics – Roche Diagnostics Ltd
Rosemont – Rosemont Pharmaceuticals Ltd
Rybar – Shire plc Ltd
Salts - Salts Healthcare Ltd
Sandoz – Sandoz Ltd
Sankyo – Sankyo Pharma UK Ltd
Sanofi-Aventis – Sanofi-Aventis Ltd
Sanofi Oasteur – Sanofi Pasteur MSD Ltd
Sanofi-Synthélabo – Sanofi-Aventis Ltd
Schering-Plough – Schering-Plough Ltd
Schwarz – Schwarz Pharma Ltd
Searle – Pfizer Ltd
Seqirus - was Novartis Vaccines
Serono – Serono Pharmaceuticals Ltd
Servier – Servier Laboratories Ltd
Shire – Shire plc Ltd
SHS – SHS International Ltd
Sigma – Sigma Pharmaceuticals plc
SMA Nutrition – Wyeth
SNBTS – Scottish National Blood Transfusion Service, Protein Fractionation Centre
Solvay – Solvay Healthcare Ltd
Squibb – Bristol-Myers Squibb Pharmaceuticals Ltd
SSL – Medlock Medical Ltd
Stiefel – Stiefel Laboratories (UK) Ltd
Takeda – Takeda UK Ltd
Taro – Taro Pharmaceuticals (UK) Ltd
Teva – Teva Pharmaceuticals Ltd
Thornton & Ross – Thornton & Ross Ltd
Trinity-Chiesi – Trinity-Chiesi Pharmaceuticals Ltd
Tyco – Covidien
Univar – Univar Ltd
Valeant – Valeant Pharmaceuticals Ltd
Viatris – Viatris Pharmaceuticals Ltd
W-L – Warner Lambert UK Ltd (Pfizer Ltd)
Warner Lambert – Warner Lambert UK Ltd (Pfizer Ltd)
Wockhardt – Wockhardt UK Ltd
Wyeth – Wyeth Pharmaceuticals
Yamanouchi – Yamanouchi Pharma Ltd

See also
 Pharmaceutical industry in the United Kingdom
 List of pharmaceutical companies
 List of pharmacy organizations in the United Kingdom
 List of pharmacy associations
 List of pharmacies
 British Approved Name (BAN)
 International Nonproprietary Name (INN)

 
Pharmaceutical manufacturers
Manufacturers in the United Kingdom